San Giorgio dei Genovesi can refer to:

 Church of San Giorgio dei Genovesi, Naples
 Church of San Giorgio dei Genovesi, Palermo
 Chapel of San Giorgio dei Genovesi, Sciacca